Anacithara querna is a species of sea snail, a marine gastropod mollusk in the family Horaiclavidae.

Description
(Original description) The length of the shell attains 5.5 mm, its diameter 2 mm. A thickened pale brown or straw-coloured shell with few ribs, the number only extending to nine on the body whorl. Altogether it is seven-whorled, two of these being apical. The outer lip is thickened. No trace of sinus is perceptible. The columella is straight. The siphonal canal is very short.

Distribution
This marine species occurs off Iran

References

External links
 Tucker, J.K. (2004). "Catalog of recent and fossil turrids (Mollusca: Gastropoda)". Zootaxa. 682:1–1295.

querna
Gastropods described in 1910